Camilla is a city in Mitchell County, Georgia, United States, and is its county seat.  As of the 2020 census, the city had a population of 5,187, down from 5,360 in 2010.

History
The city was incorporated in 1858. The name "Camilla" was chosen in honor of the granddaughter of Henry Mitchell, a Revolutionary War general for whom Mitchell County was named.

Camilla and Mitchell County were originally Creek country, surrendered to the United States in the 1814 Treaty of Fort Jackson. Georgia divided the land ceded by Native Americans into lots to be given away in land lotteries. The lottery of 1820 awarded lands covering much of the southwest section of the state (applying only to land south of the future Lee County line and extending west to the Chattahoochee River and east to settled counties in east Georgia), including the area later known as Mitchell County. Despite having access to free land, few people moved to the region. Citizens hesitated to improve land, according to an early twentieth-century history the region "which God Almighty had left in an unfinished condition." It took approximately forty years (1820–1857) for the area to obtain its necessary legal population to become a separate county, after which Camilla became the county seat.

In the early 2000s, the city was hit by two disastrous sets of tornadoes, both occurring in the dark hours of the early morning and both going through roughly the same area. The first outbreak was on February 14, 2000; the second was on March 20, 2003.

Camilla massacre 

Camilla became the site of a racially-motivated political white-on-black riot on Saturday, September 19, 1868.  Determined to promote political and social reform with an organized rally, 150–300 freedmen, along with Republican political candidates, marched toward the town's courthouse square for the rally. The local sheriff and "citizens committee" in the majority-white town warned the black and white activists of the impending violence and demanded that they forfeit their guns, even though carrying weapons was customary at the time. The marchers refused to give up their guns and continued to the courthouse square, where a group of local whites, quickly deputized by the sheriff, fired upon them. This assault forced the Republicans and freedmen to retreat as locals gave chase into the swamps, killing an estimated nine to fifteen of the black rally participants while wounding forty others. "Whites proceeded through the countryside over the next two weeks, beating and warning Negroes that they would be killed if they tried to vote in the coming election." The Camilla Massacre was the culmination of smaller acts of violence committed by white inhabitants that had plagued southwest Georgia since the end of the Civil War.(pp. 1–2)

Beating of Marion King 
On July 23, 1962, a group of civil rights activists tried to visit fellow demonstrators from Albany, Georgia, who had been jailed in Camilla. While the rally took place, Marion King, wife of Albany Movement's vice president Slater King, was beaten to the ground and kicked by Camilla police guards until she was unconscious. Mrs. King was pregnant at the time and had her young children with her. She suffered a miscarriage after the ordeal. The 2012 song "Camilla" from the eponymous album by Caroline Herring pays a tribute to Mrs. King's memory.

Geography
Camilla is located in central Mitchell County at  (31.230243, −84.209102). U.S. Route 19 is the main highway through the city, passing east of the downtown. US 19 leads north  to Albany and southeast  to Thomasville. State Routes 37 and 112 pass through the center of Camilla as Broad Street. Route 37 leads east  to Moultrie and northwest  to Newton, while Route 112 leads northeast  to Sylvester and south  to Cairo. State Route 97 leads southwest from Camilla  to Bainbridge.

Climate
The climate in this area is characterized by hot, humid summers and generally mild to cool winters.  According to the Köppen Climate Classification system, Camilla has a humid subtropical climate, abbreviated "Cfa" on climate maps. Camilla has a relatively wet climate with high precipitation year-round, as typical of the eastern United States. Its southerly latitude in Georgia causes a greater tropical influence resulting in very mild winters in comparison with Atlanta for example.

Demographics

2020 census

As of the 2020 United States census, there were 5,187 people, 1,926 households, and 1,325 families residing in the city.

2000 census
As of the census of 2000, there were 5,669 people, 1,994 households, and 1,405 families residing in the city. The racial makeup of the city was 65.23% African American, 32.30% White,  0.12% Native American, 0.44% Asian, 0.04% Pacific Islander, 1.25% from other races, and 0.62% from two or more races. Hispanic or Latino of any race were 2.20% of the population.

There were 1,994 households, out of which 34.1% had children under the age of 18 living with them, 33.5% were married couples living together, 33.1% had a female householder with no husband present, and 29.5% were non-families. 26.3% of all households were made up of individuals, and 11.4% had someone living alone who was 65 years of age or older.  The average household size was 2.76 and the average family size was 3.32.

In the city, the population was spread out, with 30.3% under the age of 18, 10.6% from 18 to 24, 26.8% from 25 to 44, 18.9% from 45 to 64, and 13.5% who were 65 years of age or older.  The median age was 31 years. For every 100 females, there were 81.1 males.  For every 100 females age 18 and over, there were 73.0 males.

The median income for a household in the city was $22,485, and the median income for a family was $24,232. Males had a median income of $23,581 versus $20,000 for females. The per capita income for the city was $13,117.  About 34.3% of families and 37.7% of the population were below the poverty line, including 54.9% of those under age 18 and 20.0% of those age 65 or over.

Education

Mitchell County School District 
The Mitchell County School District holds grades pre-school to grade twelve, and consists of two elementary schools, a middle school, a high school, and a charter school. The district has 176 full-time teachers and over 2,855 students. The Mitchell County Head Start Center opened in 2001.  District schools include:
South Mitchell County Elementary School
North Mitchell County Elementary School
Mitchell County Middle School
Mitchell County High School

Charter school 
Baconton Community Charter School

Private education 
Westwood Schools

Higher education 
Andersonville Theological Seminary  has its headquarters based in Camilla.  The distance education seminary is accredited through the Association of Independent Christian College and Seminaries. The seminary's headquarters consists of two administrative buildings.

Law and government 

The legislative authority of the government of the City of Camilla is vested in the six-member Council. Council members serve for terms of four years and until their respective successors are elected and qualified. Three members are elected from and by the voters of Council District No. 1, and three members are elected from and by the voters of Council District No. 2.

Mayor
 Mayor Kelvin Owens (term expires December 31, 2023)

Council members
 W.D. Palmer, III (District 2; term expires December 31, 2025)
 Raymond Dewayne Burley (District 1; term expires December 31, 2025)
 Corey Morgan (District 1; term expires December 31, 2023)
 Steve Collins (District 2; term expires December 31, 2023)
 Venterra Pollard (District 1; term expires December 31, 2025)
 Laura Beth Tucker (District 2; term expires December 31, 2025)

Transportation
U.S. Highway 19 is the major travel route through the city, connecting Camilla to Albany in the north and Thomasville to the south
Georgia State Route 112 connects Cairo to the south and Sylvester to the northeast
Georgia State Route 37 connects Moultrie to the east

Notable people

Kathryn Stripling Byer (1944-2017), poet and teacher; North Carolina Poet Laureate 2005–2009
Oscar Branch Colquitt (1861–1940), former governor of Texas  
Danny Copeland (born 1966), NFL defensive back; Super Bowl winner with Washington Redskins
Tiger Flowers (1895–1927), first Black middleweight boxing champion of the world
James Griffin (born 1961), ex-NFL safety with Detroit Lions
Krysta Harden, former U.S. Deputy Secretary of Agriculture
Jumaine Jones (born 1979), professional basketball forward for Bnei HaSharon of Israel
Fred Nixon (born 1958), ex-NFL player with Green Bay Packers
Orson Swindle (born 1937), US Marine Corps colonel and former POW with John McCain in Vietnam

Gallery

See also
Impact of the 2019–20 coronavirus pandemic on the meat industry in the United States

References

Further reading

External links
 
 Camilla Chamber of Commerce

Cities in Georgia (U.S. state)
Cities in Mitchell County, Georgia
County seats in Georgia (U.S. state)